Jalen Henry (born January 8, 1996) is a professional American basketball player who plays for BC Körmend of the Hungarian first division. He mainly plays power forward and center.

References

1996 births
Living people
American men's basketball players
Sporting CP basketball players
Power forwards (basketball)
Sportspeople from Springfield, Illinois